USS Positive (AMc-95) was an Acme-class coastal minesweeper acquired by the U.S. Navy for the dangerous task of removing mines from minefields laid in the water to prevent ships from passing.

Positive was laid down 7 June 1941 by the Noank Shipbuilding Co., Noank, Connecticut, launched 7 March 1942 sponsored by Miss Elizabeth W. Dunn, and placed in service 20 August 1942.

World War II service 

After shakedown, Positive departed Miami, Florida, 19 February 1943, for Guantanamo Bay, Cuba. After performing minesweeping duty for the Naval Operating Base at Guantanamo, from March 1943 to January 1945, she departed Guantanamo 21 January for San Juan, Puerto Rico. Upon completion of duty, she arrived at Charleston, South Carolina, 7 September. Positive was placed out of service 12 November 1945, and struck from the Naval Vessel Register 8 May 1946. She was delivered for deposal to the Maritime Commission, Charleston, 7 November 1946.

References

External links 
 NavSource Online: Mine Warfare Vessel Photo Archive - Positive (AMc 95)

Accentor-class minesweepers
Ships built in Groton, Connecticut
1942 ships
World War II minesweepers of the United States